Friedrich Smend (26 August 1893 – 10 February 1980) was a German Protestant theologian and librarian at the Preußische Staatsbibliothek in Berlin, publishing a catalogue of the writings of Adolf von Harnack. He was a liturgist, teaching as professor at the Kirchliche Hochschule Berlin. His publications focus on the work of Johann Sebastian Bach and Johann Wolfgang von Goethe.

Life 
Born in Strasbourg, Smend belonged to a family of jurists and theologians. Members of three generations had served as pastors of the Reformed parish of Lengerich in the 18th and 19th centuries. His father Julius Smend was professor, first in Strasbourg, and then from 1918 first dean of the Protestant theological faculty of the University of Münster. His uncle was the theologian Rudolf Smend. 

Smend studierd Protestant theology in Münster, promoted to the doctorate. He worked as librarian of the Preußische Staatsbibliothek in Berlin from 1923, where he published a catalogue of the writings of Adolf von Harnack. After World War II, Smend was appointed prefessor of hymnology, liturgics and church music at the Kirchliche Hochschule Berlin, where he remained until retirement in 1958.

He was awarded honorary doctorates from the universities of Heidelberg and Mainz. In 1961, he received the Commanders Cross of the Order of Merit of the Federal Republic of Germany.

Smend focused on studies of the work of Johann Sebastian Bach and Johann Wolfgang von Goethe, specifically Bach's Mass in B minor, St Matthew Passion and St John Passion, as well as number symbolism in Bach's works.

He died in Berlin at age 86.

Publications 
 Adolf von Harnack. Verzeichnis seiner Schriften. Leipzig 1927; Nachtrag 1927-1930. Leipzig 1931 (reprinted: Adolf von Harnack. Verzeichnis seiner Schriften bis 1930. Mit einem Geleitwort und bibliographischen Nachträgen bis 1985 von Jürgen Dummer. Saur, Munich 1990, ISBN 3-598-10321-2).
 Joh. Seb. Bach Kirchen-Kantaten. in 6 volumes. Christlicher Zeitschriftenverlag, Berlin 1947–48 (2nd edition 1950; 3rd edition 1966).
 Johann Sebastian Bach bei seinem Namen gerufen. Bärenreiter, Kassel 1950.
 Bach in Köthen. Christlicher Zeitschriftenverlag, Berlin 1951–52 (in English: St. Louis, Concordia Publishing House, 1985).
 Goethes Verhältnis zu Bach. , Berlin 1955.
 Missa ; Symbolum Nicenum ; Sanctus ; Osanna, Benedictus, Agnus Dei et Dona Nobis Pacem (später genannt „Messe in h-moll“). Bärenreiter, Kassel 1956.
 Ferner Freunde ward gedacht : ein Beitrag zu Goethes Briefwechsel mit Marianne von Willemer. Berlin, Merseburger, 1964 
 Bach-Studien. Gesammelte Reden und Aufsätze. Bärenreiter, Kassel 1969.

References

Further reading 
 Festschrift für Friedrich Smend zum 70. Geburtstag.  Merseburger, Berlin 1963 (pp. 98–100 catalogue of his works).
 Peter Wackernagel: Aus glücklichen Zeiten der preussischen Staatsbibliothek. Erinnerungen an Freunde und Kollegen und Freunde von einst. in: Festschrift für Friedrich Smend zum 70. Geburtstag, Merseburger, Berlin 1963, pp. 61–62.

External links 
 
 Dadelsen, Georg von: Friedrich Smend's Edition of the B-minor Mass by J. S. Bach 1 (in German) taylorfrancis.com

20th-century German Protestant theologians
Liturgists
20th-century German musicologists
20th-century German non-fiction writers
Bach scholars
Commanders Crosses of the Order of Merit of the Federal Republic of Germany
1893 births
1980 deaths